Ted Beckett (February 15, 1907 – June 1978) was an American football player.  He played college football at University of California, Berkeley and was a consensus selection at the guard position on the 1930 College Football All-America Team. He died in 1978 at Reno, Nevada, at the age of 71.

References

1907 births
1978 deaths
American football guards
California Golden Bears football players
All-American college football players
Players of American football from California